Neil Peter Matthews (born 3 December 1967) is a former professional footballer. He began his career with Blackpool before moving to Cardiff City. He later finished his professional career with Rochdale where he became the club's first international representative at any level. 

Although born in England, Matthews represented Northern Ireland at international level, winning single caps for the country's under-21, under-23 and B sides.

Career
Matthews began his career as a youth player with Blackpool, where he also won caps for Northern Ireland at under-21 and under-23 levels. He made his professional debut for Blackpool as a teenager and went on to make over 75 appearances in all competitions for the club before leaving in 1990 following their relegation to the Fourth Division.

He instead joined Cardiff City, making his debut as a substitute during a 0–0 draw with Lincoln City on 15 August 1990. During his time at the club he became known for his versatility, playing in several different positions other than his normal defensive role. In May 1992, he moved to Norwegian side Sogndal on a six-month loan spell before returning to Cardiff where he was part of the side that achieved promotion from the Third Division and won the Welsh Cup after defeating Rhyl in the final.

He signed for Rochdale in 1993 and later became the club's first player to win an international cap at any level after representing the Northern Ireland B side in a match against Scotland B in 1995. His spell with the side was plagued with injuries and he made just nineteen league appearances during a two year spell at Spotland Stadium.

References

1967 births
Living people
Footballers from Manchester
Blackpool F.C. players
Cardiff City F.C. players
Sogndal Fotball players
Rochdale A.F.C. players
English Football League players
Association football defenders
Northern Ireland youth international footballers
Northern Ireland under-21 international footballers
Association footballers from Northern Ireland
Eliteserien players
English expatriate footballers
Expatriate footballers in Norway
English expatriate sportspeople in Norway
English footballers